Dreaming the Dark: Magic, Sex, and Politics is a 1982 book by Starhawk about magic, spirituality, politics, ethics, and sex. Along with Margot Adler's Drawing Down the Moon (1979), the book politicized practices of Paganism and witchcraft by emphasising their radical and feminist aspects, and as a result drew many radical feminists into their orbit.

Editions

References

External links 
Goodreads Review
Starhawk's Webpage

1982 non-fiction books
Beacon Press books
Books about spirituality
Books by Starhawk
English-language books
Feminist books
Occult books
Works by Starhawk